Dorothy Andrews Elston Kabis (March 22, 1917 – July 3, 1971) was a Republican Party activist and former Treasurer of the United States from Delaware , having served from May 8, 1969, until her death. She was the only treasurer to marry while in office.

Biography
Elston Kabis died of a heart attack in Sheffield, Massachusetts, at 54 while visiting her father's grave. In her honor, the NFRW established an internship program for young women.

Name change
Following her appointment as treasurer by U.S. President Richard M. Nixon as Dorothy Andrews Elston, she married Walter L. Kabis (1914–2009), a World War II Pacific Navy veteran on the USS England (DE-635) and a school principal from Wilmington, Delaware, in 1970 and changed her name to Dorothy Andrews Elston Kabis. She became the first (and so far only) treasurer to have their name changed while in office, an event significant because the signature of the Treasurer of the United States appears on U.S. paper currency.

As Elston, Kabis signature appeared on the series 1969 one-dollar bill. The resulting change in Kabis' signature appeared first on the Series 1969A note, so designated to show a different name as treasurer, even though it was the same person.

References

1917 births
1971 deaths
Treasurers of the United States
People from Wilmington, Delaware
Delaware Republicans
Methodists from Delaware
Politicians from Wilkes-Barre, Pennsylvania
American horticulture businesspeople
Farmers from Delaware
Women in Delaware politics
American women farmers
20th-century American businesspeople
20th-century American businesswomen
20th-century American politicians
People from Middletown, Delaware